Marshall Sykes (born 29 December 1999) is a Scotland international rugby union player. He plays for Edinburgh Rugby in the United Rugby Championship. Sykes' primary position is lock.

Rugby Union career

Professional career

Skyes began his professional career in the Scottish Rugby Academy and was part of the Glasgow Warriors academy as a Stage 3 player. He played for Ayrshire Bulls in the Super 6 league. Sykes then signed for Edinburgh in June 2020,  He made his Pro14 debut in the final round of the 2019–20 Pro14 against Glasgow Warriors.

International career

In October 2021 he was called up to the Scotland squad for the Autumn internationals.

He made his Scotland debut against Tonga on 30 October 2021. Scotland won the match 60-14.

External links
itsrugby Profile

References

1999 births
Living people
Edinburgh Rugby players
Rugby union locks
Scottish rugby union players
Scotland international rugby union players
Glasgow Warriors players
Ayr RFC players
Rugby union players from Suffolk